The 1978 Asian Taekwondo Championships were the 3rd edition of the Asian Taekwondo Championships, and were held in Hong Kong from 8 to 10 September, 1978.

Medal summary

Medal table

Participating nations 
49 athletes from 11 nations competed.

 (8)
 (1)
 (4)
 (8)
 (8)
 (7)
 (1)
 (1)
 (1)
 (8)
 (2)

References

Results
Results, Page 6

External links
WT Official Website

Asian Championships
Asian Taekwondo Championships
Asian Taekwondo Championships
Taekwondo Championships